Jan Kapr (12 March 1914, in Prague – 29 April 1988, in Prague) was one of the most prolific Czech composers of the second half of the 20th century.

Life 
He studied at the Prague Conservatory, as a pupil of Jaroslav Řídký, and at the master school under Jaroslav Křička. In 1939–1946 he worked as a director in the Czechoslovak Radio. Later (in 1950–1952) he was the chief-editor in the publishing house Orbis. In sixties he worked as a teacher at the Janáček's Academy in Brno. His work was also part of the music event in the art competition at the 1948 Summer Olympics.

References

Sources
Jaroslav Smolka: Malá encyklopedie hudby. Prague: Editio Supraphon, 1983. (p. 315-316)

External links
Extensive Biography and Selection of Works

1914 births
1988 deaths
20th-century classical composers
20th-century Czech male musicians
Czech classical composers
Czech male classical composers
International Rostrum of Composers prize-winners
Musicians from Prague
Olympic competitors in art competitions
Prague Conservatory alumni
Czechoslovak musicians